Ted Hurley (born Thaddeus C. Hurley in 1944) is an Irish mathematician specialising in algebra, specifically in group theory, group rings, cryptography, coding theory, and computer algebra.  Most of his academic career was spent at University College Galway (later renamed National University of Ireland Galway, or simply NUI Galway).  He was Head of Discipline of Mathematics there from 1996 to 2010.

Education
Ted Hurley was born in September 1945 in Tuam, Co. Galway, Ireland, to James Hurley and Bridget Walsh. He earned his BSc (1965) and MSc (1966) from University College Galway (UCG), also winning the Peel Prize in Geometry and the Sir Joseph Larmor Prize.  He was awarded a National University of Ireland Travelling Studentship Prize (1966), and was then appointed a Tutorial Research Fellow at Royal Holloway College, University of London, while conducting his doctoral research at nearby Queen Mary College. His 1970 thesis on "Representations of Some Relatively Free Groups in Power Series Rings" was done under Karl W. Gruenberg.

Career
Hurley taught at Imperial College in London (1970-1971) and then at the University of Sheffield (1971-1974), before returning to Ireland. Hurley was a founding member of the Irish Mathematical Society in 1976, and served as its inaugural secretary (1977-1979). After six years on the staff at University College Dublin (UCD), in 1980 he secured a position at his alma mater, University College Galway (later known as the National University of Ireland Galway), from which he officially retired in 2010. He was Lecturer in Mathematics there from 1980 to 1988, Associate Professor from 1988 to 1996, and Professor of Mathematics from 1996 on. He was also Head of Discipline of Mathematics from 1996 to 2010. He has been active in the years since formal retirement, publishing frequently.

He has also been a vocal public commentator on mathematics' education, including the importance of numeracy and mathematics to our lives, in the Irish print media
 and has also discussed these issues on popular national radio shows.

Mathematics
Hurley's work was originally mostly in group theory, specifically on structural features of infinite groups (relatively free groups, commutators and powers in groups), and also group rings.  Later, his interests expanded to include algebraic coding theory and cryptography.

He has supervised three PhD students and has co-edited several conference proceedings.

Selected papers
 2021 "Unique builders for classes of matrices Special Matrices", Hurley, Ted. Special Matrices, vol. 9, no. 1, 2021, pp. 52-65. 
 2018  "Coding theory: the unit-derived methodology". Hurley T., Hurley D., International Journal of Information and Coding Theory, 5 (1):55-80
 2018  "Quantum error-correcting codes: the unit design strategy". Hurley T., Hurley D., Hurley B. International Journal of Information and Coding Theory, 5 (2):169-182
 2017  "Solving underdetermined systems with error-correcting codes". Hurley, T. International Journal of Information and Coding Theory, 4 (4)
 2014  "Cryptographic schemes, key exchange, public key". Hurley, Ted. International Journal Of Pure And Applied Mathematics, 6 (93):897-927 
 2014  "Algebraic Structures for Communications". Hurley, Ted (2014). Contemporary Mathematics, (611):59-78
 2014  "Systems of MDS codes from units and idempotents". Hurley, Barry and Hurley, Ted (2014). Discrete Mathematics, (335):81-91
 2011  "Group ring cryptography". Hurley, B.,Hurley, T. (2011). Int. J. Pure Appl. Math, 69 (1):67-86
 2009  "Convolutional codes from units in matrix and group rings". Hurley, T. (2009). Int. J. Pure Appl. Math, 50 (3):431-463]
 2006  "Group Rings And Rings Of Matrices". Hurley T., Hurley D., International Journal of Information and Coding Theory, Vol 31 No. 3 2006, 319-335
 2000  "Groups related to Fox subgroups". Hurley, T,Sehgal, S (2000). Communications In Algebra, 28 :1051-1059
 1996  "The modular Fox subgroups". Hurley, T.C.,Sehgal, S.K. (1996). Commun. Algebra, 24 (14):4563-4580
 1991 "The Lie Dimension Subgroup Conjecture*", Thaddeus C. Hurley and Sudarshan K. Sehgal, Journal Of Algebra 143, 46-56
 1990 "On the Class of the Stability Group of a Series of Subgroups", Ted Hurley. Journal of the London Mathematical Society s2-41(1)
 1986  "On commutators and powers in groups II". Hurley, T.C. (1986). Arch. Math, 46 (5):385-386

Conference proceedings edited
 Groups '93 Galway/St Andrews (1995, in 2 volumes), selected papers from the international conference "Groups 1993 Galway/St Andrews", University College Galway, August 1993. Edited by T. C. Hurley, S. J. Tobin, J. J. Ward, C. M. Campbell & E. F. Robertson, Cambridge (LMS Lecture Note Series 211).
 The First Irish Conference on the Mathematical Foundations of Computer Science and Information Technology (MFCSIT2000) (2002), papers from conference held in Cork, Ireland, 20th and 21st July, 2000.  Edited by Ted Hurley, Micheal Mac an Airchinnigh, Michel Schellekens and Anthony Seda. Elsevier Science (Electronic Notes in Theoretical Computer Science, Vol 40)
 The Second Irish Conference on the Mathematical Foundations of Computer Science and Information Technology (MFCSIT2002) (2003), papers from conference held in Galway, Ireland, 18th and 19th of July, 2002.  Edited by Ted Hurley, Sharon Flynn, Micheal Mac an Airchinnigh, Niall Madden, Michael McGettrick, Michel Schellekens and Anthony Seda. Elsevier Science (Electronic Notes in Theoretical Computer Science, Vol 74)
 The Third Irish Conference on the Mathematical Foundations of Computer Science and Information Technology (MFCSIT2004) (2006), papers from conference held in Dublin, Ireland, 22nd and 23rd July, 2004.  Edited by Ted Hurley, Micheal Mac an Airchinnigh, Michel Schellekens, Anthony Seda & Glenn Strong. Elsevier Science (Electronic Notes in Theoretical Computer Science, Vol 161)
 The Fourth Irish Conference on the Mathematical Foundations of Computer Science and Information Technology (MFCSIT2006) (2009), papers from conference held at University College Cork, Ireland, 1st to 5th August July 2006. Edited by Ted Hurley, Micheal Mac an Airchinnigh, Michel Schellekens, Anthony Seda, Glenn Strong and Menouer Boubekeur. Elsevier Science (Electronic Notes in Theoretical Computer Science, Vol 225)

References

External links
 

Group theorists
Coding theorists
Irish cryptographers
Academics of the University of Galway
Academics of Imperial College London
Academics of University College Dublin
Academics of the University of Sheffield
Alumni of Queen Mary University of London
People from Tuam
20th-century Irish mathematicians
21st-century Irish mathematicians
Living people
1944 births